This is a list of museum collections pertaining to the Muisca. Most of the Muisca artefacts are housed in the Gold Museum, Bogotá, the museum with the most golden objects in the world. Other findings are in the Archaeology Museum in Sogamoso and in the Archaeology Museum of Pasca. Few artefacts are on display outside Colombia. Most of the objects outside Colombia are tunjos; small offer pieces part of the Muisca religion.

Muisca museum collections

See also 
List of Muisca research institutes
List of Muisca scholars
Muisca

References 

Museum
Muisca
Muisca
Museum collections